Between 1925 and 1945, the German Schutzstaffel (SS) grew from eight members to over a quarter of a million Waffen-SS and over a million Allgemeine-SS members.  Other members included the SS-Totenkopfverbände (SS-TV), which ran the Nazi concentration and extermination camps. The following list of SS personnel gives the names of notable persons who are counted among the organization's most famous, influential or notorious members. Women were not allowed to join the SS but were allowed into the SS-Gefolge and many served within the concentration camps.

Führer (Adolf Hitler)

Prior to 1934 the SS were nominally under the command of the Sturmabteilung and so it could be said that both Adolf Hitler as Oberster SA-Führer and Ernst Röhm as Stabschef SA outranked the most senior SS position of Reichsführer-SS. Following the Night of the Long Knives Hitler "raised the SS, hitherto subordinate to the SA, to the rank of an independent organisation". Hitler also was considered SS Member No. 1, Emil Maurice (considered the founder of the SS) was member No. 2, although leadership was assumed by Julius Schreck who was member No. 5. Himmler was SS member No. 168. Based on the seniority system of SS membership number, this made Hitler senior in the SS to all other members even if not by rank.

After the Night of the Long Knives, when the SS became independent from the SA, Hitler was listed on SS officer rolls as member No. 1 and considered supreme commander of the entire SS (Oberster Führer der Schutzstaffel: Literally, "Supreme Leader of the SS") by virtue of his position as the Führer of Germany. There is no photographic record of Hitler ever wearing an actual SS uniform nor was there a special SS insignia for Hitler above that worn by Himmler.

Oberster Führer der Schutzstaffel

SS Generals
Following is the list of persons holding the title positions as well as actual highest ranks of the Schutzstaffel (SS) since the earliest inception of the armed SS units in Nazi Germany. The ranks include distinctive insignia designs worn on the collar at one points by all officers.

Reichsführer

Oberst-Gruppenführer (colonel general)

Obergruppenführer (general)

Gruppenführer (lieutenant general)

Brigadeführer (major general)

SS Officers

Oberführer (senior colonel)

Standartenführer (colonel)

Obersturmbannführer (lieutenant colonel)

Sturmbannführer (major)

Hauptsturmführer (captain)

Obersturmführer (first lieutenant)

Untersturmführer (second lieutenant)

SS Non-Commissioned Officers

Sturmscharführer (Regimental sergeant major)

Hauptscharführer (sergeant major)

Oberscharführer (staff sergeant)

Scharführer (sergeant)

Unterscharführer (corporal)

SS-Stabsscharführer

SS biologist

SS-Kapellmeister

See also
 Glossary of Nazi Germany

 List of Nazi Party leaders and officials
 Nuremberg Trials
 Orpo rank
 RuSHA Trial
 Uniforms and insignia of the Schutzstaffel

Notes
Former SS Ranks changed after 1934:
 SS rank Sturmhauptführer renamed Hauptsturmführer
 SS rank Sturmführer renamed Untersturmführer
 SS rank Obertruppführer renamed Hauptscharführer
 SS rank Truppführer renamed Oberscharführer
 SS rank Scharführer renamed Unterscharführer
 SS rank Haupttruppführer renamed Sturmscharführer

References

SS personnel
 
SS ranks